Steven "Catfish" McDaris (born 1953) is an American poet and author who is often associated with Allen Ginsberg. He is also notable for having collaborated with Charles Bukowski.

Biography
McDaris was born in Albuquerque, New Mexico in 1953.

After 3 years serving in the military as a young man, he hopped freights and hitchhiked across the U.S. and Mexico. He built adobe houses, tamed wild horses, made cattle troughs, worked in a zinc smelter, and painted flag poles.

For a time, he lived in a cave and wintered in a Chevy in Denver.

He eventually settled in Milwaukee, Wisconsin where he worked for the United States Postal Service.

In 1994, he organized a charity event of poetry and music in Milwaukee, called Wordstock. During the same year, he also read at The First Underground Press Conference at De Paul University in Chicago. 

In 1998, he read at a Beatnik festival held near Allen Ginsberg's farm,

In 2007, he read at Shakespeare & Co. Bookstore in Paris.

Reception and influence
McDaris has published extensively in the small press and independent magazines. He is also often associated with Allen Ginsberg
 and collaborated with Charles Bukowski on a chapbook called 'Prying'. In addition, his work has appeared in such publications as The Penny Dreadful Review, Chiron Review, the Shepherd Express 
 and Blink-Ink Marquette University holds his collected published works and personal papers in their special collections archives.

Awards and nominations
1999 The Uprising Award.
2010 The Flash Fiction Award at Gypsy, as judged by U.S. Poet Laureate.
2015 The Thelonious Monk Award at

Publications
 Van Gogh's Ear-Skinner's, Irregular Horse, 1994
 The Moon Gets Laid Skinner's, Irregular Horse, 1994
 Pyramids On Mars, KPG Press, 1994,
 Iguana In Your Pocket (with Nathan Beaty), Green Eggs & Ham Press, 1995
 Drowning In Your Bloodshot Eyes (with Jim Buchanan), Angelflesh Press, 1995
 Catfish In The Pecos, Angelflesh Press, 1996
 Magic Buffalo by The Peyote Brothers (with elliott), Angelflesh Press, 1997
 Prying (with Charles Bukowski and Jack Micheline), Four-Sep Publications, 1997
 Funk/Works (with Mark Sonnenfeld), Marymark Press, 1998
 And The Horse You Rode In On, Born Again(st)Christian Press, 1998
 The Wolf Pack (with Mark Wisniewski and Wolf Vest), Pariah Press, 1999
 Bitchslapped (art by Swanky Mike Tolento), A Pick Pocket Book published by Phony Lid Books, 2002
 Maow-Miaou-Editions, Microbe(French/English), 2000
 Tears from Nowhere, Spunk, 2001
 Coyoacan, JVC Books, 2001
 A Field Of Dancing Horses, fingerprint press, 2004
 Making Love To The Rain, Propaganda Press, 2010
 Dancing Naked On Bukowski's Grave, Horror,Sleaze,Trash Press (with Ben John Smith) , 2011
 Tales From A French Envelope, (with Craig Scott) Ten Pages Press , 2011
 Naked Fly Cherry Marijuana, Graffiti Kolkata (India), 2012
 Waiting On Nothing, Mad Rush Books  ,  2012
 Jupiter Orgasma, Mad Rush Books  ,  2013 Hard Cover
 Thieves of the Wind  (with Subhankar Das)  Writing Knights Press, 2014
 Cannibal Sunflowers   Writing Knights Press, 2014
Resurrection of a Sunflower    Collated and 10 pages by Catfish McDaris
    525 pages    
Dreaming With Frida Kahlo        200 pages               
Magic Coyote Rain Dance                              24 pages                 
The Ass Of The Statue Of Liberty                     24 pages                
Blue Throat Of Day              170 pages              
Ghosts of the War Elephants      144 pages             
Rock ‘N’ Roll  Poetry Poesie Rock “N’ Roll 
joint French/English mini-Chap with Eric Dejaeger                                                                                 
Talking Shit and Doing the Funky Chicken with John D Robinson
Meat Grinder with Donald Armfield    147 pages
 Buffalo Nickels, Grandma Moses Press, 2014
 Switcheroo (with David Mac)  Mac Press in England,  2014
 Day 4 (with Alexis Rhone Fancher, John Swain, & Bree)  Green Panda Press  2014
 66 lines On Your Soul (with Subhankar Das & Kevin Ridgeway) Graffiti Kolkata India 2014
 Naked Serial Killers In Volkswagens   Weekly Weird Monthly, Austin, Texas  2015
 No Blindfold No Cigarette   Black Dharma Press  Dynatox Ministries, NJ   2015
 Sleeping With the Fish  Pski's Porch Lockport, NY 
ψ 27 Hammerheads Circling Ever Closer   315 pages

References

American male poets
1953 births
Living people
Writers from Albuquerque, New Mexico
Poets Laureate of Milwaukee